Royal Pari Fútbol Club, best known as Royal Pari, is a Bolivian football club based in Santa Cruz de la Sierra. Founded in 2002, it plays in the Bolivian Primera División after being promoted for the 2018 season.

History
The club was founded in 2002 in El Pari neighborhood in Santa Cruz de la Sierra, taking its name from it. It entered the Santa Cruz Association Championships, reaching the association's Primera B (third tier) in 2006 but being relegated after finishing last in the relegation tournament. Royal Pari returned to Primera B in 2009 and stayed in this division until 2012, when it was promoted to the ACF's Primera A. The club had poor results in its first season in the competition, getting only 23 points in 38 matches and conceding 80 goals.

On 14 September 2013, the club was purchased by the Grupo SION, and returned to the ACF's Primera A after just one season by winning the Primera B championship. In their return to the Primera A for the 2014–15 season, the club established an unbeaten streak of 12 matches and ended up as runners-up after losing a tiebreaker match to Guabirá, thus qualifying for the Copa Bolivia, which was held in Santa Cruz de la Sierra. The club finished in first place of its group after beating Deportivo Arauco Prado and qualified for the Liga Nacional B.

The 2015–16 season was Royal Pari's first appearance in the Nacional B, in which they were eliminated from the semifinal stage on goals scored after losing to Universitario de Tarija. Royal Pari returned to the Primera A championship for the 2016–17 season, finishing as runners-up in the first stage and in fifth place in the second stage. Since Destroyers had won both stages and had become champions as a result, the runners-up of both stages had to play for the second berth into the national second tier championship, now the Copa Simón Bolívar. In that tiebreaker, Royal Pari beat Real América and qualified for the competition along with Destroyers.

For the 2017 Copa Simón Bolívar, Royal Pari was placed in a group with the representatives from the departments of Beni, Pando, and fellow Santa Cruz representative Destroyers. After an outstanding campaign in this stage, in which it earned 24 points in 10 matches, it qualified to the semifinals where they faced Atlético Bermejo from the department of Tarija. The first leg was won by Royal Pari by a score of 1–0, while the second leg in Bermejo ended in a 2–2 draw that qualified the club for the final. In the final, Royal Pari faced Deportivo Kala from Oruro, with whom it drew both legs, forcing a tiebreaker match played in Sucre which was won by Royal Pari by a 6–2 score, thus earning its first ever promotion to the División Profesional.

In their first season in Bolivia's top tier and led by Peruvian manager Roberto Mosquera, Royal Pari managed to end in third place in the Torneo Clausura (after leading the tournament for several matches and having a chance to win it on their last game against eventual champions San José) and fifth place in the aggregate table, performance which was enough to assure them a berth into the 2019 Copa Sudamericana, the first time the club has qualified for an international competition. Royal Pari defeated Monagas from Venezuela on penalties and Macará from Ecuador on away goals in the first two rounds of the competition before being knocked out in the round of 16 by Colombian club La Equidad.

Supporters
The club began to gain followers among evangelical Christians , because it was considered a Christian club when in 2013 it passed into the hands of the Sion business group, a company run by Christians. The club also quotes verses from the Bible on its social media.

Being his early evangelical followers, many of them also follow Christian Zionism and are pro-Israel.

Over time, due to its sporting achievements, the club has gained a following outside of the evangelicals, mainly in Santa Cruz.

La 12
It is the official group of fans of the club, they stand out for the cleaning of garbage that their members do at club matches.

Current squad

Honours

Domestic
Copa Simón Bolívar:
Winners (1): 2017

ACF Primera A:
Runners-up (2): 2014–15, 2016–17

References

External links
 Official website 

Football clubs in Bolivia
Association football clubs established in 2002
2002 establishments in Bolivia